Norbert Kovács (born 13 April 1977) is a Hungarian footballer who plays for Békéscsabai Előre FC as midfielder.

External links
Profile at hlsz.hu

1977 births
Living people
Hungarian footballers
Association football defenders
Békéscsaba 1912 Előre footballers
Sportspeople from Székesfehérvár